This is a list of incidents and accidents that Vietnam Airlines has experienced since its inception in 1956.

Fatal incidents
4 January 1967: An Ilyushin Il-18D (built in 1964) crashed at Nanking Airport, China.
 26 March 1981: An Ilyushin Il-18D, registration VN-B190 (built in 1968), crashed in Hoa Binh Province, Vietnam.
17 February 1988: An Tupolev Tu-134A, registration VN-A108 (built in 1976), crashed at Noi Bai International Airport, Hanoi, Vietnam.
9 September 1988: Vietnam Airlines Flight 831, a Tupolev Tu-134 (built in 1978), registration VN-A102, departed from Hanoi with 81 passengers aboard and crashed while on approach to Bangkok. There were 76 fatalities and the aircraft was entirely destroyed. The aircraft flew into a heavy thunderstorm and was probably struck by lightning. The aircraft then exploded after it crashed into a field  short of Don Mueang International Airport.
14 November 1992: Vietnam Airlines Flight 474, a Yakovlev Yak-40 (built in 1976), registration VN-A449, originating in Ho Chi Minh City with 31 passengers on board crashed while approaching the Nha Trang Airport in a tropical storm. There were 30 deaths; the only survivor was a Dutch woman, Annette Herfkens. The aircraft was entirely destroyed.
3 September 1997: Vietnam Airlines Flight 815, a Tupolev Tu-134 (built in 1984), registration VN-A120, crashed on approach to Phnom Penh's Pochentong Airport, killing 65 of the 66 passengers on board. The aircraft was entirely destroyed. The aircraft was flying from Ho Chi Minh City to Phnom Penh. The Tupolev was approaching the Phnom Penh airport runway in heavy rain from 2,000 meters; at this point the control tower ordered the pilot to attempt an approach from the west due to a wind pick-up. The crew then lost communication with the tower, and three minutes later the aircraft collided at low level with trees, damaging the left wing. The aircraft then slid 200 yards into a dry rice paddy before exploding. Pilot error was later identified as the cause of the crash; the pilot continued his landing descent from an altitude of 2,000 meters to 30 meters even though the runway was not in sight, and ignored pleas from his first officer and flight engineer to turn back. When the aircraft hit the trees, the pilot finally realized the runway was not in sight and tried to abort the approach; the flight engineer pushed for full power, but the aircraft lost control and veered left; the right engine then stalled, making it impossible to gain lift.

Non-fatal incidents
Here are a number of non-fatal incidents:
12 January 1991: A Tupolev Tu-134, registration VN-A126, with 76 passengers on board crashed on final approach to Ho Chi Minh City. At  the Tupolev suddenly lost height and landed hard, touching down with the left main gear first. There were no casualties but the aircraft was entirely destroyed.
16 November 1996: A Vietnam Airlines Tupolev Tu-134, registration VN-A114, crashed at Da Nang. The aircraft veered onto the left runway when its landing gear collapsed upon landing.
17 April 2006: Pilots flying a Boeing 777 from Hanoi to Frankfurt lost communication with ground control for more than an hour as the aircraft flew over Ukraine, Poland and the Czech Republic. After Czech air traffic controllers tried unsuccessfully to contact the plane for 25 minutes, the Czech Air Force sent two jet fighters to flank the airliner. The pilots then realized their mistake and turned the communications system on. The pilots were suspended by the airline and made to undergo more training before they could fly again.
21 October 2010: Flight VN535, a Boeing 777-200ER, experienced severe turbulence over Russia during a Paris-bound flight. Of the 222 passengers and 15 crew members on board, 21 were injured. Nine of those were hospitalised following landing at Paris-Charles de Gaulle Airport.

Hijackings and threats
28 October 1977: Four armed Vietnamese hijackers seeking asylum in Singapore seized a Douglas DC-3, registration VN-C509, en route from Ho Chi Minh City to Phu Quoc Island with 32 passengers on board. Two of the six crew members were killed and a third was wounded before the aircraft was forced to land in Singapore. The hijackers surrendered after negotiating with Singapore officials for five hours.
28 June 1978: A Douglas DC-4, registration VNC-501 was hijacked by eight people who were equipped with a Makarov pistol, knives and a grenade. The hijackers had a gunfight with crew members and security guards. One was killed by grenade, three jumped out from the aircraft and were killed. Four others were captured by the police after landing. 
7 February 1979: An Antonov An-24, registration VN-B226, was hijacked by six people, who were overpowered and killed by the security guard on board.
4 September 1992: Vietnam Airlines Flight 850, an Airbus A310-200, registration LZ-JXB, leased from Jes Air, with 127 occupants on board en route from Bangkok to Ho Chi Minh City, hijacked by Ly Tong, a former pilot in the Republic of Vietnam Air Force. He then dropped anti-communist leaflets over Ho Chi Minh City before parachuting out. Vietnamese security forces later arrested him on the ground. The aircraft landed safely, and no one on board was injured. He was released from a Hanoi prison in 1998.
In December 2010, Vietnamese police arrested Nguyen Bang Viet, a former Vietnam Airlines employee, for allegedly sending text messages to other employees about a bomb planted in October 2010 on a Hanoi–Siem Reap flight. This prompted VNA to cancel the flight.
5 January 2022: Flight 5311, a Boeing 787-9, registration VN-A868, was departing Tokyo bound for Hanoi and was about to enter Tokyo Bay, when a man called the airline's office at Narita and threatened to shoot down the flight over Tokyo Bay. The flight diverted to Fukuoka and stayed there for about 2 hours before departing for Hanoi.

References

Vietnam Airlines
 
Vietnam Airlines
Vietnam Airlines